Railroadin' is an Our Gang short comedy film directed by Robert F. McGowan. Produced by Hal Roach and released to theaters by Metro-Goldwyn-Mayer, it was the 88th release in the Our Gang series.

Plot
The gang is playing around the railroad station, and Joe and Chubby's father, an engineer, lectures against the kids playing in such a dangerous area. True to his word, after Joe and Chubby's father leaves, a crazy man starts a train with most of the kids on it, save for Farina who is nearly run over several times.

Once Farina manages to climb aboard himself, the kids attempt to stop the runaway locomotive, but have no luck until the engine crashes into a grocery truck. As it turns out, however, the entire incident is revealed to be a dream Farina had as Joe and Chubby's father lectured the kids about rail-yard safety.

Production notes
Railroadin' is a partial remake of The Sun Down Limited. The film marked the first appearance of Norman Chaney as "Chubby", having won a national contest to replace Joe Cobb as the Our Gang "fat kid".

Lost soundtrack
Like many early sound films, Railroadin' was recorded using a sound-on-disc synchronization process - the soundtracks for the film were held on separate phonographic records, which would be played by a projectionist in synch with the film. The sound discs for the film went missing at MGM in the 1940s, and only the film negative survived. When MGM sold Roach the catalog of Our Gang films made at the Roach studio, it therefore acquired only the picture element of Railroadin'; as such, the short was never included in any of the Little Rascals theatrical reissue or television distribution packages.

Home movie distributor Blackhawk Films produced a silent film adaption of Railroadin' with text titles in the 1970s, leading to the film's first release in any form since its original theatrical release. In 1982, the long-lost sound discs for Railroadin' were located in an MGM vault, and the film was finally made available with sound for the first time in decades via a 1983 VHS release by Blackhawk. Railroadin' has since been released on DVD as well, but was never added into the Little Rascals television package, despite being restored to sound.

Cast

The Gang
 Norman Chaney as Chubby
 Joe Cobb as Joe
 Jean Darling as Jean
 Allen Hoskins as Farina
 Bobby Hutchins as Wheezer
 Mary Ann Jackson as Mary Ann
 Harry Spear as Harry
 Pete the Pup as Himself

Additional cast
 Ed Brandenburg as Bob, the brakeman
 Mrs. Norman T. Chaney as Passenger
 Dorothy Hamilton Darling as Passenger
 Otto Fries as Otto, Joe's father
 Jack Hill as Grocery truck driver
 Robert F. McGowan as Man who stumbles on the limited

See also
 Our Gang filmography

References

External links

1929 films
American black-and-white films
1929 comedy films
Films directed by Robert F. McGowan
Hal Roach Studios short films
Our Gang films
1920s American films
1920s English-language films